Grön is a Finnish/Swedish surname.

Notable people with this surname include:
 Eino Grön (born 1939), Finnish-American singer
 Klara Grön (c 1800), Finnish prostitute

See also
 Ebba Grön, Swedish punk band

Finnish-language surnames